Tomokto is a rural locality (an ulus) in Kurumkansky District, Republic of Buryatia, Russia. The population was 36 as of 2010. There are 9 streets.

Geography 
Tomokto is located 36 km southeast of Kurumkan (the district's administrative centre) by road. Argada is the nearest rural locality.

References 

Rural localities in Kurumkansky District